Big Grove Township occupies the  square in the southwest corner of Kendall County, Illinois. As of the 2010 census, its population was 1,647 and it contained 654 housing units.

Geography
It contains Newark and portions of Lisbon.

U.S. Route 52 crosses the township east to west.

Demographics

Government
The township is governed by an elected Town Board of a Supervisor and four Trustees.  The Township also has an elected Assessor, Clerk, and Highway Commissioner.

References

External links
 city-data.com

Townships in Kendall County, Illinois
Townships in Illinois